Jath State,  was one of the non-salute Maratha princely states of British India, one of the former Southern Maratha Jagirs. Jath State and Daphlapur State were the only two states belonging to the Bijapur Agency under the Bombay Presidency, which later became part of the Deccan States Agency. 

The state was founded in 1686 by the hereditary Patil (chief) of Daphlapur. 
The Raja was married to Princess Usharaje Gaekwad of Baroda who was the grand daughter of Maharaja Sayajirao Gaekwad.

History
The Hindu ruling family of Jath State were Dafles of the Maratha Chavan clan, descendants of Lakhmajirao Yeldojirao Chavan, the Patil of Daphlapur. Lakhmajirao Yeldojirao Chavan entered the service of King Ali Adil Shah of Bijapur, and received a Desmukhi Watan of four Mahals in 1672. The Jagirs of Jath and Karajagi were conferred on his son in 1680. Emperor Aurangzeb confirmed these estates to the family in 1704. The male line failed four times during the state's history. Consequently, the state was either vested in widowed Ranis or ruled for them by regents for a total of seven decades.

Together with the small state of Daphlapur, Jath State formed the Bijapur Agency, under the collector of Bijapur District. Daphlapur had an area of only 249 km2 and was annexed by Jath State in the early 20th century owing to lack of succession.

In 1911, the state enjoyed a revenue estimated at £24,000 and paid a tribute to the British Raj of £700. Its flag was an orange rectangle with a four-pointed star in the upper left hand corner.

Rulers of Jath

The rulers of Jath belonged to the Dafle dynasty and took the title of 'Deshmukh'. The last ruler Vijayasingh Rao Ram Rao took the title of 'Raja'.

Deshmukhs 
 1686 - 1706 Satvaji Rao (b. 16... - d. 1706)
 1706 - 1754  Yesu Bai "Au Sahib" (b. ... - d. 1754)
 1754 - 1759  Yeshwant Rao (b. ... - d. 1759)
 1759 - 1790  Amrit Rao I (b. ... - d. 1790)
 1790 - 1810  Khanji Rao (b. 17... - d. 1810)
 1810 - 1822  Renuka Bai (b. ... - d. 1822)
 1822 - Dec 1823  Sali Bai (b. ... - d. 1823)
 Dec 1823 - Aug 1835  Ram Rao I Narayan Rao "Aba Sahib Dafle" (b. ... - d. 1835)
 Aug 1835 - 29 Jul 1846  Bhagirathi Bai (b. ... - d. 1846)
 29 Jul 1846 – 11 Jan 1892  Amrit Rao II "Rao Sahib Dafle" (b. 1835 - d. 1892)
 13 Jan 1892 – 14 Aug 1928  Ram Rao II Amrit Rao "Aba Sahib Dafle" (b. 1886 - d. 1928)
 14 Aug 1928 – 23 Jun 1936  Vijayasingh Rao Ram Rao "Baba Sahib Dafle" (b. 1909 - d. 1998)
Anil Raje Daphale (d.2020)
Indrajeet Raje Daphale

Raja 
Lieutenant Commander Shrimant Raja Vijaysinghrao Ramrao Babasaheb Dafle, educated like his father, Ramrao II,  at the Rajkumar College, Rajkot, was the last ruler of Jath. Jath joined the Dominion of India on 8 March 1948 and is currently a part of the Sangli District in the state of Maharashtra. Regarded as something of a model ruler, Vijaysinhrao, the last sovereign ruler received the hereditary title of Raja in 1936. He formed a very effective partnership with his younger brothers, introducing far reaching educational, health and administrative reforms. He was also a noted cricket player. The Raja took up politics and represented his people in both the provincial and national parliaments after Indian Independence in 1947.
 23 Jun 1936 – 15 Aug 1947  Vijayasingh Rao Ram Rao "Baba Sahib Dafle"

See also
 Maratha
 Maratha Empire
 List of Maratha dynasties and states
 List of Indian princely states

References

Princely states of Maharashtra
Sangli district
1686 establishments in Asia